Khánh Hòa  is a rural commune (xã) and village of the Châu Phú District of An Giang Province, Vietnam. The commune adjoins Châu Đốc to the northwest and lies about 40 kilometres from Long Xuyên.
 
Khánh Hòa commune covers an area of 22.12 square kilometres and according to population census in 1999, has a population of 24,486 people. The commune includes nine villages and hamlets: Khánh Phát, Khánh Bình, Khánh Châu, Khánh Thuận, Khánh Lợi, Khánh Đức, Khánh Hòa, Khánh An and Khánh Mỹ.

References

Communes of An Giang province
Populated places in An Giang province